Moonee Ponds Junction is a bus and tram interchange on the junction of Ascot Vale Road / Pascoe Vale Road and Mount Alexander Road in Moonee Ponds, Melbourne (Puckle Street / Dean Street also meets at the same point). It is located approximately 400 metres east of Moonee Ponds station. In June 2015, Yarra Trams revealed plans to build a covered tram stop. The work was completed in January 2016.

Trams 
It is served by Yarra Trams routes 59 and 82. Previously route 82 trams terminated at a separate platform south of the existing pair in the middle of the Ascot Vale Road. As part of the January 2016 rebuild, a headshunt was built to the north of the main platforms with route 82 now terminating at the main platform.

Buses
Moonee Ponds Junction has nine bus stands that are served by CDC Melbourne, Dysons, Kastoria Bus Lines, Moonee Valley Coaches and Transit Systems.

Bay 1:
404: Footscray via Newmarket

Bay 2:
472:Williamstown via Footscray

Bay 3:
504: Clifton Hill station via Brunswick East
505: University of Melbourne via Parkville Gardens

Bay 4:
506: Westgarth station via Brunswick

Bay 5:
508: Alphington via Brunswick and Northcote

Bay 6:
476: Watergardens station via Keilor

Bay 7:
469: Keilor East via Strathmore

Bay 8:
477: Broadmeadows station via Essendon, Airport West and Gladstone Park

Bay 9:
483: Sunbury via Diggers Rest

References

External links
Wongm's gallery

Bus stations in Australia
Road junctions in Australia
Tram stops in Melbourne
Transport in the City of Moonee Valley